John Sinclair Brown (September 30, 1880 – January 15, 1965) was a Virginia politician. He represented Roanoke County in the Virginia House of Delegates, and served as that body's Speaker from 1930 until 1936.

Brown Library, built in 1969, is the main academic library at Virginia Western Community College in Roanoke, Virginia and was named for Colonel Brown in recognition of his service to the Roanoke Valley community.

References

External links
 
 

Members of the Virginia House of Delegates
Speakers of the Virginia House of Delegates
People from Roanoke County, Virginia
1880 births
1965 deaths
20th-century American politicians
People from Warm Springs, Virginia